George McPhee (born July 2, 1958) is a Canadian ice hockey executive currently serving as the president of hockey operations for the Vegas Golden Knights of the National Hockey League (NHL). McPhee served general manager of the Washington Capitals and has also served as alternate governor, vice president and special assistant to the general manager of the New York Islanders. Resigning as the Golden Knights general manager on September 1, 2019, McPhee continues to serve as president of hockey operations.

Before becoming an executive, McPhee was also a professional ice hockey Forward. Although he was not drafted, he won the Hobey Baker Award in 1982 as the best NCAA men's ice hockey player, and played for the New York Rangers and New Jersey Devils.

Early life
Though born and raised in Guelph, Ontario, McPhee spent most of the first two years of his life in Glace Bay, Nova Scotia, where his father and grandparents were from.

Playing career
Prior to his career in management, McPhee was a prominent college hockey player at Bowling Green State University for the Falcons ice hockey team. He was the recipient of the 1982 Hobey Baker Award (given to college hockey's top player), was chosen as a First-Team All-Central Collegiate Hockey Association (CCHA) selection in 1982, Second-Team All-CCHA honors in 1979 and 1981 and was the CCHA's Rookie of the Year in 1979. After leaving Bowling Green, he won the 1983–84 Central Hockey League championship (the Adams Cup) as a member of the Tulsa Oilers team coached by Tom Webster.

McPhee began his NHL career in the 1983 Stanley Cup playoffs for the New York Rangers. In those playoffs, he and Ray Cote of the Edmonton Oilers became the first players to score three goals in a single Stanley Cup playoffs prior to playing a regular season NHL game. McPhee ultimately had a seven-year career in the NHL, playing for the Rangers and New Jersey Devils.

Management career

Vancouver Canucks
In 1992, McPhee assumed his first major NHL management position, starting as vice president and director of hockey operations (as well as alternate governor) for the Vancouver Canucks, assisting then-general manager Pat Quinn. With McPhee, the team made the playoffs four times, won a division championship, and played in the 1994 Stanley Cup Finals, which they lost to the New York Rangers.

Washington Capitals
When McPhee joined the Washington Capitals in 1997, the team was looking to turn around its long storied history of being a top regular season performer that disappointed in the playoffs. His tenure began well as he engineered the club's first trip to the Stanley Cup Finals appearance in his first season, which the Capitals lost to the Detroit Red Wings. The team played well under the general management of McPhee, winning seven Southeast Division championships (1999–2000, 2000–01, 2007–08, 2008–09, 2009–10, 2010–11 and 2012–13), eight 40-or-more win seasons (1997–98, 1999–2000, 2000–01, 2007–08, 2008–09, 2009–10, 2010–11, and 2011–12) and a franchise-record 121-point season (2009–10).

On September 25, 1999, McPhee, angry at what he perceived to be dirty play by the Chicago Blackhawks, punched then Blackhawks head coach Lorne Molleken outside the Chicago locker room after their teams' exhibition game. Molleken sustained injuries to his head and in response, Blackhawks players and team aides jumped McPhee, leaving him with a torn suit. On October 1, 1999, NHL commissioner Gary Bettman suspended McPhee for one month without pay and fined him $20,000.

Throughout the 2003–04 season, McPhee and Capitals owner Ted Leonsis opted to dump salary on the Capitals' roster and focus on youth. In a "fire sale", the Capitals traded Sergei Gonchar, Jaromír Jágr, Peter Bondra, Michael Nylander, Mike Grier, Robert Lang and captain Steve Konowalchuk that season. McPhee began rebuilding the team by selecting Russian phenom Alexander Ovechkin with the first overall pick in the 2004 NHL Entry Draft; Ovechkin would live with McPhee's family as a rookie during the 2005–06 season.

The 2007–08 season would prove hopeful for McPhee, as the Capitals appeared poised to turn the corner in their development. However, after the Capitals began the season with a 6–14–1 record, McPhee fired head coach Hanlon on November 22 and replaced him with Bruce Boudreau, the head coach of the Capitals' American Hockey League (AHL) affiliate, the Hershey Bears. McPhee's change worked and the 2007–08 season would end with an unprecedented comeback and an unexpected Southeast Division championship. McPhee's trade deadline acquisitions of veterans Sergei Fedorov, Matt Cooke and Cristobal Huet all played large roles in leading the Capitals to their third Southeast Division title.

In 2013, McPhee traded Swedish winger Filip Forsberg to the Nashville Predators in exchange for Martin Erat and Michael Latta. Forsberg was the Capitals' first-round pick in the 2012 NHL Entry Draft, selected 11th overall.

In 2014, McPhee's tenure in Washington ended when the Capitals declined to renew his contract. He was succeeded by Brian MacLellan, a childhood friend and teammate from Guelph, Ontario, and a college teammate at Bowling Green.

New York Islanders
On September 23, 2015, it was formally announced that McPhee had joined the New York Islanders in the role of an alternate governor, vice president and special advisor to general manager Garth Snow.

Vegas Golden Knights
On July 13, 2016, McPhee left the Islanders organization after he was hired by Bill Foley, owner of the Las Vegas expansion franchise (which would later be named the Vegas Golden Knights) to be the new general manager of the team. McPhee was named a finalist for the NHL General Manager of the Year Award after the Golden Knights had a phenomenal inaugural season, which he would be awarded on June 20.

Personal life
McPhee interned on Wall Street in New York for two off-seasons while playing for the Rangers in the 1980s. After retirement from his professional playing career, he studied law at Rutgers University's law school in New Jersey and clerked for a judge on the United States Court of International Trade before moving into a hockey management career.

McPhee is married to wife Leah, with whom he has three children: son Graham (a Boston College Eagles player drafted 149 overall in the 2016 NHL Entry Draft by the Edmonton Oilers), now playing with the Oilers' AHL affiliate, the Bakersfield Condors, and daughters Grayson and Adelaide.

Career statistics

Awards and honours

References

External links

1958 births
Living people
Bowling Green Falcons men's ice hockey players
Canadian ice hockey forwards
Canadian people of Scottish descent
Hobey Baker Award winners
Ice hockey people from Ontario
National Hockey League general managers
New Haven Nighthawks players
New Jersey Devils players
New York Rangers players
Sportspeople from Guelph
Tulsa Oilers (1964–1984) players
Undrafted National Hockey League players
Utica Devils players
Vancouver Canucks executives
Vegas Golden Knights executives
Washington Capitals executives
Canadian expatriate ice hockey players in the United States
AHCA Division I men's ice hockey All-Americans